The 2002 Copa del Rey Final was the 100th final since its establishment. The match took place on 6 March 2002 at the Santiago Bernabéu Stadium, Madrid. The match was contested by Real Madrid and Deportivo de La Coruña, and it was refereed by Manuel Mejuto González. Deportivo lifted the trophy for the second time in their history with a 1–2 victory over Real Madrid.

Match details

References

External links
 Integral TVE broadcast video of the 2002 Copa del Rey Final at YouTube
 Review of the event at Marca.com

2002
1
Real Madrid CF matches
Deportivo de La Coruña matches
2002 in Madrid
Nicknamed sporting events